Andrew Johnston (December 20, 1694 – June 24, 1762) was a politician from Perth Amboy, New Jersey, who served in the New Jersey General Assembly and the New Jersey Provincial Council.

Early life
Andrew Johnston was born on December 20, 1694, to John Johnstone (1661-1732) and Euphame Johnstone (née Scot). His maternal grandfather was George Scot of Pitlochie. The children of John Johnstone dropped the final "e" from their name.  His elder brother, John Johnston, was the father of prominent merchant and politician David Johnston.

Career
Until approximately 1717/8, he was a merchant in New York City, subsequently relocating to Perth Amboy, New Jersey.

Johnston represented the City of Perth Amboy with his father in the ninth New Jersey General Assembly (1727–1729 Legislative Session). After the elder Johnstone's death in 1732, Andrew Johnston took his father's seat in the tenth Assembly for the 1733 seating. After this, the Assembly did not meet until 1738, when Governor Lewis Morris called new elections and the eleventh Assembly was seated. Johnston would serve in the eleventh, twelfth and thirteenth Assemblies (1738–1744), and was Speaker during the twelfth and thirteenth. (1740–1744)

After his service in the General Assembly, on June 19, 1745, Johnston was appointed a member of the New Jersey Provincial Council, where he would serve until his death.

In 1747, Andrew Johnston was serving as Mayor of Perth Amboy, New Jersey.

In 1748/9, he was named Treasurer of the College of New Jersey.

Perth Amboy Constituency
In 1702, the royal instructions to Governor Viscount Cornbury named the Town of Perth Amboy as a constituency, apportioned two members to the New Jersey General Assembly. In 1718, Perth Amboy was granted city status; the same apportionment continued until the adoption of the New Jersey Constitution of 1776, which apportioned the entire New Jersey Legislature by county, thereby abolishing separate representation for cities.

Personal life
He married Catherine Van Cortlandt, the daughter of Stephanus Van Cortlandt (1643–1700) and Gertruj Van Schuyler. Van Schuyler was the daughter of Philip Pieterse Schuyler (1628-1683) and the older sister of Pieter Schuyler (1657-1724), the first mayor of Albany. Together, Andrew and Catherine had:

 John Johnston
 Stephen Johnston
 Anne Johnston
 Gertrude Johnston
 Catherine Johnston
 Margaret Johnston
 Elizabeth Johnston
 Mary Johnston
 Euphemia Johnston, who married her first cousin, John Johnston, a Colonel of the New Jersey Provincial troops at the capture of Fort Niagara during the French and Indian War in 1758.

Andrew died on June 24, 1762, in Perth Amboy, New Jersey.

References

1694 births
1762 deaths
Mayors of Perth Amboy, New Jersey
Members of the New Jersey General Assembly
Speakers of the New Jersey General Assembly
American people of Scottish descent
People from Middlesex County, New Jersey
Members of the East New Jersey Provincial Council
Politicians from New York City
People of colonial New Jersey